América Air Linhas Aéreas is a small airline based in São Paulo, Brazil.

Fleet
The airline flies the Embraer EMB-120 Brasilia.

External links
 America Air website
 America Air Linha Aérea
 America Air Táxi Aéreo

Airlines of Brazil